Nepathya (also spelled as Nepathaya) is a Nepalese folk rock band that was formed in the early 1990s by three students from Pokhara while studying in Kathmandu, Nepal. Nepathya was formed by Deepak Rana, Bhim Poon and Amrit Gurung. They started recording songs which after 25 years have made them the greatest band ever of Nepal. Nepathya is best known for blending folk melodies with modern western-influenced rock music. Nepathya has enjoyed both commercial and critical success. Nepathya is well known for contemporary tunes that have strong ties with indigenous music and songs sung using regional dialects from rural Nepal.

Members 

 Amrit Gurung (Vocalist)
 Suraj Thapa (Keyboard)
 Subin Shakya (Bass Guitar)
 Dhurba Lama (Drums)
 Niraj Gurung (Lead Guitar)
 Shanti Rayamajhi (Madal)

Amrit Gurung
The moving force behind this band is Amrit Gurung who is generally from Pokhara, (Pumdi Bhumbi) (Nepal) who wears Gandhian frames (supposed to have been presented to him from one of his aunts who was a staunch follower of Mahatma Gandhi) and sings about peace and harmony. He is the only currently active founding member of the band. His songs encompass all of Nepal and are not limited to Kathmandu Valley. By hobby, he is a photographer and a traveler. He has been to more than 76 out of the 77 districts (Bajhang still left to explore by Mr Gurung till the date) of Nepal, most of them on foot.
Nepathya has seen many changes in its band's line up. Till date, more than 19 members have joined and left the band. But the founder and the brain behind Nepathya is unfazed. "Being in Nepathya is like being part of a serious journey. Anyone who deviates from team spirit and artistic commitment finds it hard to stay with the team", says Gurung. They have toured the UK, the US, Australia, Japan, Israel, Germany, Finland, and India among others with their live performance. They have performed in the United States in Summer 2012 and they became the first Nepali band/artist to have performed in Wembley Arena, the UK on August 3, 2013. The band is also planning for such shows more around the world.

Nepathya live at Wembley Arena

Nepathya became the first Nepalese band to perform at Wembley Arena, UK on August 3, 2013. The concert was jointly presented by Parcha Productions (Nawal Rai and Samir Gurung) and Subsonic Routes. Nepathya was successful to charm the 8000 strong Wembley crowd (mostly Nepalese living in the UK and Europe). The concert was a huge commercial success. Nepathya's Wembley Arena concert is also the biggest ever performance by a Nepali band.

Albums
Nepathya has released nine albums to date.

Nepathya – 1991 (featuring Barashat Ko Mausam)
Himal Chuchure – 1993 (featuring Chekyo Chekyo, Euta Chitthi)
Min Pachas Ma – 1995 (featuring Jomsom Bazar Ma, Chari Maryo Shisai Ko Goli Le)
Shringar – 1997 (featuring Saruma Rani, Yarling, Yatra)
Resham – 2001 (featuring  Resham, Yo Zindagani)
Bhedako Oon Jasto – 2003 (featuring – Bhedako Oon Jasto, Sa Karnali, Taalko Pani, Samsajhaima)
Ghatana – 2005 (featuring – Ghatana)
Mero Desh – 2009 (featuring – Rato Ra Chandra Surya, Kasaile Sodhe, Aama, Mero Desh)
Aina Jhyal – 2010 (featuring – Siranma Photo Cha, Jogale Huncha Bhet, Salaijyo)

Style and lyrical themes
The band started as a folk-pop band. The genre changed to contemporary rock and folk rock. They were able to use this fusion music to captivate wider listeners from different age groups and cultures. The lyrics usually depicted love and nature in their earlier albums. Their later albums began focusing on patriotism, peace and current issues plaguing Nepal. The album Ghatana released during the civil war period contains songs that tell the people the need for peace in the country and highlights the sentiment of the people as well as incites patriotism among the listeners. They are releasing a new album soon.

See also

 Music of Nepal

References

External links
 

Nepalese rock music groups
1991 establishments in Nepal
Musical groups from Pokhara